Waidhofen an der Thaya-Land is a municipality in the district of Waidhofen an der Thaya in the Austrian state of Lower Austria.

Populations

References

External links 

Cities and towns in Waidhofen an der Thaya District